West Province was an electoral province of the Legislative Council of Western Australia between 1894 and 1989. It elected three members from 1894 to 1965 and two members from 1965 to 1989.

Members

Notes

References
 David Black (2014), The Western Australian Parliamentary Handbook (Twenty-Third Edition), pp. 221–222

Former electoral provinces of Western Australia
1894 establishments in Australia
1989 disestablishments in Australia